"So It Goes" is a song written and recorded by Nick Lowe in 1976. The single was Nick Lowe’s solo debut following his departure from Brinsley Schwarz, and was the first single released on Stiff Records.

Background
Following the demise of the band Brinsley Schwarz, Lowe had formed the ad hoc band Spick Ace & the Blue Sharks with Martin Stone of The Pink Fairies and members of Dr. Feelgood. Contractual difficulties prevented their recordings being released and despite manager Jake Riviera's efforts record companies were not interested in signing Lowe as a solo artist.

In the summer of 1976, Riviera borrowed £400 from Dr. Feelgood's Lee Brilleaux and rock photographer Keith Morris and along with former Brinsley Schwarz manager Dave Robinson formed Stiff Records. Stiff gave Lowe £45 to record two songs and accompanied only by drummer Steve Goulding of The Rumour recorded "So It Goes" and the B-side, “Heart of the City”. The single was released on 14 August 1976 with the catalogue number Stiff BUY1. The single was marketed through specialist shops and by mail order. Although it failed to chart, it more than recouped its investment and helped kick-start a new generation of DIY independent labels.

The record has the following messages in the run out grooves: "Earthlings Awake" and "Three Chord Trick Yeh".

Reception
The single was voted the fifth-best single of the year according to the New Musical Express critics poll. James Honeyman-Scott of the Pretenders cited the song, alongside Elvis Costello's "(The Angels Wanna Wear My) Red Shoes", as one of the inspirations for his jangly guitar sound. He explained, "They had this big, jangly guitar sound, which is what I'd been wanting to get into for a long while. All of a sudden the radio's on and there's this huge guitar sound coming out, like sending out a big Rickenbacker 12-string or something. And I thought, 'Ah, my time is here.' So that's what happened. And then I hooked up with the Pretenders."

The song is featured in the 1979 film Rock 'n' Roll High School (with the Ramones), the 2009 film Adventureland and in the video game Grand Theft Auto Online on the radio station Kult FM 99.1.

Personnel
Nick Lowe – vocals, bass, guitar
Steve Goulding – drums

Covers

References

 

1976 songs
1976 debut singles
Songs written by Nick Lowe
Nick Lowe songs
Stiff Records singles